Miedziana Góra  is a village in Kielce County, Świętokrzyskie Voivodeship, in south-central Poland. It is the seat of the gmina (administrative district) called Gmina Miedziana Góra.

The village has a population of around 10,000.

References

Villages in Kielce County
Kielce Governorate
Kielce Voivodeship (1919–1939)